Aethes bicuspis is a species of moth of the family Tortricidae. It is found in Goiás, Brazil.

The wingspan is 12 mm for males and 14 mm for females. The ground colour of the forewings is white with a slight yellowish admixture and weak pale ochreous-creamy suffusions at the base of the wing and towards the tornus. The hindwings are light brownish grey, but darker at the apex and whiter basally.

References

Moths described in 2002
bicuspis
Moths of South America